The accessory nail of the fifth toe, also known as petaloid toenail, is a physical trait of the small toe, where a minuscule "sixth toenail" is present in the outer corner of the nail situated on the smallest toe.

Trait 
The trait can be observed on either one or both feet, where there is a separation of the toenail situated on the smallest toe. The separated part of the nail forms a smaller "sixth toenail" on the corner of the larger, or "main" section of the toenail, on the outermost side of the foot, which protrudes outwards from the corner of the larger nail. The additional "nail" can be cut with a nail clipper, just like any other nail.

Genome-wide scans indicate that it is a heritable trait. However, instead of following a Mendelian pattern of inheritance, it is likely to be a complex trait affected by multiple genes with minor genetic effects.

Removal 
Many people do not request or seek out removal, as the accessory nail typically does not cause symptoms. Surgical or chemical matricectomy, or complete removal or destruction of the nail matrix, has been used for successful removal of the accessory toenail.

Legend 
While it was thought to be a  prevalent feature amongst Han Chinese, it is observed in people from all ethnicities and races.

Chinese mythology has it that during the time of the Yellow Emperor, there were two types of people living in China: those who were the descendants of the Yellow Emperor, and those who were nomadic Qiang people. The Henan people, led by Yin Wang, attacked the Qiang and abducted a Qiang woman, who later tried to escape.  Yin Wang stabbed her in the abdomen as she tried to escape, so she gave birth to two children with a scar on the small toe of the foot. The children were taken back by Yin Wang for adoption, and their descendants were born with double nails on their small toes.

See also 
Dominance (genetics)
Mongolian spot
Epicanthal fold
 Congenital malformations of the dermatoglyphs
 List of cutaneous conditions

References 

Cutaneous congenital anomalies
Human anatomy
Toes